The women's moguls at the 2011 Asian Winter Games was held on 31 January 2011 at Tabagan Sport and Recreation Complex in Almaty, Kazakhstan.

Schedule
All times are Almaty Time (UTC+06:00)

Results
Legend
DNS — Did not start

Qualification

Final

References

Results

External links
Official website

Women's moguls